Sharavati Express is a weekly passenger train service of Indian Railways between Mysore and Mumbai. This train follows the same time slot as that of Chalukya Express. This runs via Hassan and joins the Bangalore-Hubli main line at Arsikere. It is named after the Sharavati River of Karnataka.

Sharavati Express operates as train number 11035 from Dadar to Mysore and as train number 11036 in the reverse direction.

External links
Train information on IndiaRailInfo
https://www.trainspnrstatus.com/runningstatus/11035-sharavathi-exp
https://www.akshartours.com/pnr-status/

Named passenger trains of India
Rail transport in Karnataka
Transport in Mysore
Express trains in India